Rune Reilly Kölsch or simply Kölsch is a Danish electronic dance musician and DJ.
He has worked with artists such as Coldplay, Imogen Heap, London Grammar, Tiga, Sasha and Michael Mayer.

Career
In 2003, Kölsch and Johannes Torpe released the track "Calabria", an instrumental house tune with a synthesized saxophone riff, on Credence, a sublabel of Parlophone Records, for which he received the Danish Music Award in 2004. In the 2000s, several remakes of "Calabria" were released, including a version by Drunkenmunky and a mashup titled "Destination Calabria" by Alex Gaudino featuring Crystal Waters, a veritable international hit in many countries, whilst in June 2022 two songs using the same sample were climbing the UK Top 30, one by DJ Nathan Dawe, the other by West London drill rapper Benzz.

In 2017, Kölsch performed on top of the Eiffel Tower in Paris for Cercle.

Discography

Studio albums 
2013: 1977
2015: 1983
2017: 1989
2019: Fabric Presents Kölsch
2020: Now Here No Where
2021: Isopolis

Singles 
 2010: "Loreley"
 2010: "Silberpfeil"
 2011: "Opa"
 2011: "Der Alte"
 2012: "All That Matters" (with Troels Abrahamsen)
 2013: "Goldfisch"
 2013: "Zig"
 2014: "Cassiopeia"
 2015: "Two Birds"
 2015: "DerDieDas"
 2016: "KIR"
 2016: "Grey"
 2017: "Goodbye"
 2017: "Push"
 2018: "Left Eye Left"
 2018: "Emoticon"
 2018: "Little Death"
 2018: "Hal" (with Tiga)
 2019: "The Lights" (with Sasha)
 2020: "Glypto"
 2020: "Shoulder of Giants"
 2020: "Remind you"
 2020: "Sleeper must awaken"
 2020: "The Great Consumer"
 2020: "While waiting for something to care about"
 2020: "Time" (With Beacon)
 2021: "Hold/Clear"
 2021: "Louisana" (With Dubfire)
 2022: "ULM" (With Dubfire)
 2022: "Prison Grass" (With Magit Cacoon)

Other projects

As Artificial Funk 
 1995: "Real Funk"
 1996: "Zone One"
 2000: "Use It (The Music)"
 2001: "People Don't Know"
 2002: "Together"
 2005: "Never Alone"

As Ink and Needle 
 2006: "Number One/Number Two"
 2006: "Number Three/Number Four"
 2007: "Number Five/Number Six"
 2007: "Number Seven/Number Eight"
 2008: "Number Nine/Number Ten"
 2008: "Number Eleven/Number Twelve"

As Rune RK
 2012: "Teacup"
 2013: "Burning Boombox"
 2013: "One Perfect Day" (ft. Laura V)
 2014: "Trash Talk"

As Enur
 2007: "Calabria 2007"
 2012: "I'm That Chick" (featuring Nicki Minaj & Goonrock)

Other aliases 
 2003: "Calabria", as Rune
 2003: "I Just Want to Be a Drummer", as Heavy Rock 
 2004: "Beautiful", as Rude RKade 
 2007: "Koochi Koochi", as Fashion Victims 
 2007: "Elephant", as Rune & Sydenham (with Jerome Sydenham)
 2008: "Peter Pan/Snow Bored", as Rune & Sydenham (Jerome Sydenham)

References

External links 
 Eiffel Tower
 Kölsch/Kompakt

Living people
Club DJs
Danish DJs
Danish house musicians
Reggae fusion artists
1977 births
Electronic dance music DJs